The Same Sun  is the second studio album by Irish singer-songwriter Sharon Corr and was released on 16 September 2013.

Background
Corr revealed in an interview with Nick Milligan in January 2012 that she was piecing together her second solo record. "We're going to record it in May and hopefully have it out in September/October." Sharon is taking a new approach with the writing of this record, "Mostly my whole life I've written on my own. Some of the songs I wrote for The Corrs, like "So Young" and "Radio", I wrote myself. So for the new album I've been writing with other people and that's been brilliant. It's brought other angles to my music that perhaps wouldn't have been there."

Corr finished writing the album in March 2012 and she said it may be called Catch the Moon. The title comes from the idea "of when somebody comes into your life and they utterly change yours, that you would go to any lengths for them... so you would catch the moon."  However, on 21 August 2013, it was announced that the album would be titled The Same Sun.

The Same Sun was first released in Indonesia, Argentina, Brazil, Chile and the Philippines on 16 September 2013, with selected countries following later.

Track listing

Critical reception

The Same Sun has obtained generally positive reviews from critics. According to Mojo (magazine), Corr has "unleashed a deep, husky voice to deliver '60s influenced about adult vulnerability, remorse and temptation." Graham Clark from The Yorkshire Times gave the album a 3 over 5, stating that her style is "not that far removed from Carole King, Gloria Estefan and Karen Carpenter, in fact you could imagine any of these artists singing these songs." Pip Ellwood from Entertainment Focus, who gave the album 4 stars out of 5, commented that "The Same Sun is a gorgeous collection of songs from one of the most talented female artists in the industry."

Release history

References

External links
 Take A Minute – new video, new album Sharon Corr – Official Website

2013 albums
Sharon Corr albums
Albums produced by Mitchell Froom